Street Dreams is the fifty-third studio album by American guitarist Chet Atkins, released in 1986 on the Columbia label.

Having previously recorded some of Darryl Dybka's compositions, Atkins asked Dybka to help create a jazzier musical direction. Dybka arranged, produced, and composed many of the songs on this release.

Reception

Allmusic music critic Cub Koda wrote of the album; "This 1986 album has a production sheen to it that makes it totally of its time, and it doesn't necessarily wear too well because of it. Too many synthesizers and contemporary touches simply detract from the main reason you bought it in the first place—to hear Chet Atkins play his patented fluid guitar. Although Atkins usually sounds wonderful on gut-string guitar, here his sound is pinched and curiously restrained..."

Track listing

Personnel
 Chet Atkins – guitar, arrangements
 Bruce Bolen – guitar
 Lee Ritenour –  guitar
 Paul Yandell – guitar
 David Hungate – bass guitar
 Abraham Laboriel – bass guitar
 Mark O'Connor – fiddle
 Jim Horn – saxophone
 Tom Scott – Lyricon
 Darryl Dybka – keyboards, drum programming
 Ronnie Foster – keyboards, percussion
 Ricky Lawson – drums
 Harvey Mason – drums
 Terry McMillan – drums, percussion
 Paulinho Da Costa – percussion
 E. Granat – first violin
 Alexander Horuath – violin
 Kenneth Burward-Hoy – viola
 Stephen Erdody – cello
Eddie del Barrio – keyboard arrangements
 George del Barrio – string arrangements

Production notes
Keith Seppanen - engineering
Rick Clifford - engineering assistance
Mike Poston - overdub engineering
David Palmer - remix engineering
Denny Purcell - mastering
Bill Johnson - art direction
Larry Williams - photography

References

External links
 Darryl Dybka biography

Chet Atkins albums
1986 albums
Columbia Records albums